Belle Mitchell (September 24, 1889 – February 12, 1979) was an American stage and film actress. She appeared in more than 100 films between 1915 and 1978. She was born in Croswell, Michigan and died in Woodland Hills, Los Angeles.

Partial filmography

 His Regeneration (1915, Short) - The Saloon Girl (uncredited)
 Humanity (1916)
 By the Sad Sea Waves (1917, Short) - (uncredited)
 Bliss (1917, Short)
 Rainbow Island (1917, Short)
 The Flirt (1917, Short)
 All Aboard (1917, Short)
 Move On (1917, Short)
 Bashful (1917, Short) - (uncredited)
 The Tip (1918, Short)
 Beat It (1918, Short)
 Kicked Out (1918, Short)
 No Place Like Jail (1918, Short)
 Just Rambling Along (1918, Short)
 Kicking the Germ Out of Germany (1918, Short)
 Nothing but Trouble (1918, Short)
 Take a Chance (1918, Short)
 Do You Love Your Wife? (1919)
 Going! Going! Gone! (1919, Short)
 Hustling for Health (1919, Short) - (uncredited)
 Hoots Mon! (1919, Short) 
 Just Dropped In (1919, Short)
 A Jazzed Honeymoon (1919, Short)
 An Eastern Westerner (1920, Short) - Saloon Girl (uncredited)
 Flying Romeos (1928) - Mrs. Goldberg
 Symphony of Six Million (1932) - Guest at Redemption Ceremony (uncredited)
 I Love That Man (1933) - Maria - Angelo's Wife
 Viva Villa! (1934) - Spanish Wife (uncredited)
 Stamboul Quest (1934) - Hotel Maid (uncredited)
 Rendezvous (1935) - Mexican (uncredited)
 The Leavenworth Case (1936) - The Cat Woman
 San Francisco (1936) - Louise - Mary's Maid (uncredited)
 Piccadilly Jim (1936) - (uncredited)
 Man of the People (1937) - Italian Woman (uncredited)
 Maytime (1937) - Mary (uncredited)
 The Firefly (1937) - Lola
 Madame X (1937) - Nun (uncredited)
 Blockade (1938) - Suicidal Townswoman (uncredited)
 Prison Break (1938) - Party Woman (uncredited)
 Angels with Dirty Faces (1938) - Mrs. Maggione (uncredited)
 Lady of the Tropics (1939) - Delaroch's Dinner Guest (uncredited)
 The Great Commandment (1939) - Jemuel's Wife (uncredited)
 Road to Singapore (1940) - Native Shopkeeper (uncredited)
 The Mark of Zorro (1940) - Maria
 A Night at Earl Carroll's (1940) - Woman (uncredited)
 South of Tahiti (1941) - Taupa (uncredited)
 Saboteur (1942) - Adele - Tobin's Maid (uncredited)
 Halfway to Shanghai (1942) - Yna (uncredited)
 The Leopard Man (1943) - Señora Calderon (uncredited)
 Phantom of the Opera (1943) - Feretti's Maid (uncredited)
 The Spider Woman (1943) - Fortune Teller (uncredited)
 The Song of Bernadette (1943) - Townswoman (uncredited)
 Ali Baba and the Forty Thieves (1944) - Nursemaid (uncredited)
 Cobra Woman (1944) - Native Woman (uncredited)
 Ghost Catchers (1944) - Mrs. Signatelli (uncredited)
 The Desert Hawk (1944) - (uncredited)
 Meet Me in St. Louis (1944) - Mrs. Braukoff (uncredited)
 House of Frankenstein (1944) - Urla - Gypsy Woman (uncredited)
 Sudan (1945) - Woman (uncredited)
 That Night with You (1945) - Mother with Apple (uncredited)
 Cornered (1945) - Hotel Maid (uncredited)
 Who's Guilty? (1945) - Sara Caldwell
 The Fighting Guardsman (1946) - Peasant Woman (uncredited)
 Junior Prom (1946) - Miss Hinklefink
 Freddie Steps Out (1946) - Miss Hinklefink
 High School Hero (1946) - Miss Hinklefink
 Son of the Guardsman (1946) - Dame Duncan (uncredited)
 The Beast with Five Fingers (1946) - Giovanna
 Vacation Days (1947) - Miss Hinklefink
 Unconquered (1947) - Squaw (uncredited)
 Desire Me (1947) - Baker's Wife (uncredited)
 The Prince of Thieves (1948) - Margaret Head (uncredited)
 Sword of the Avenger (1948) - Aunt
 The Vicious Circle (1948) - Mrs. Juliana Horney
 That Lady in Ermine (1948) - Ancestor (uncredited)
 The Snake Pit (1948) - Inmate (uncredited)
 Prejudice (1949) - Eddie's Mother (uncredited)
 Ghost Chasers (1951) - Madame Zola (uncredited)
 Mask of the Avenger (1951) - Busybody (uncredited)
 Thief of Damascus (1952) - Old Woman (uncredited)
 The Miracle of Our Lady of Fatima (1952) - Señora Carreira (uncredited)
 Hiawatha (1952) - Mother (uncredited)
 Scared Stiff (1953) - Zombie's Mother (uncredited)
 Tumbleweed (1953) - Tigre's Mother (uncredited)
 Phantom of the Rue Morgue (1954) - Concierge (uncredited)
 Passion (1954) - Señora Carrisa (uncredited)
 Strange Lady in Town (1955) - Catalina (uncredited)
 Hell on Frisco Bay (1955) - Sanchina Fiaschetti (uncredited)
 The First Traveling Saleslady (1956) - Emily (uncredited)
 Lust for Life (1956) - Mme. Tanguy (uncredited)
 The Book of Acts Series (1957) - Hostess
 The Return of Dracula (1958) - Cornelia (uncredited)
 The Lone Ranger and the Lost City of Gold (1958) - Caulama
 The Power of the Resurrection (1958) - Woman (uncredited)
 The Miracle (1959) - Farmer's Wife (uncredited)
 A Majority of One (1961) - Neighbor (uncredited)
 Get Yourself a College Girl (1964) - Mrs. Culverson - Faculty Member (uncredited)
 When the Boys Meet the Girls (1965) - Laughing Woman in Audience (uncredited)
 The War Lord (1965) - Old Woman
 Funny Girl (1968) - Woman on Henry Street (uncredited)
 Airport (1970) - Bertha Kaplan - Passenger (uncredited)
 High Plains Drifter (1973) - Mrs. Lake
 Soylent Green (1973) - Book #3
 Crazed (1978) - Mrs. Brewer

References

External links

 

1889 births
1979 deaths
Actresses from Michigan
American film actresses
American silent film actresses
20th-century American actresses